Jerry Andre DeLoach (born July 17, 1977) is a former American football defensive end. He played college football at California. An undrafted player in the National Football League, DeLoach played for the Washington Redskins from 2000 to 2001 and Houston Texans from the team's first season in 2002 to 2005.

Early life and college career
DeLoach was born and raised in Sacramento, California, where he graduated from Valley High School in 1995. At the University of California, Berkeley, DeLoach played at defensive end for the California Golden Bears from 1996 to 1999. In his first three seasons, DeLoach had 98 total tackles including 19 for loss totaling 80 yards, 6.5 sacks, and one interception. A second-team All-Pac-10 honoree in 1998, he played only three games in his senior season of 1999 due to neck and shoulder injuries.

Professional career
Following the 2000 NFL Draft, DeLoach signed with the Washington Redskins as an undrafted free agent on April 27, 2000. DeLoach was a member of the Washington practice squad during the 2000 regular season. In 2001, DeLoach played in 15 games with four starts for Washington, recording 11 total tackles including a sack, in addition to one pass deflected.

On March 4, 2002, the expansion Houston Texans acquired DeLoach in a trade with Washington in exchange for quarterback Danny Wuerffel, the first trade in the franchise's history. Houston had planned to select DeLoach in the expansion draft before he was pulled from the exemption list after his Washington teammate Matt Campbell was selected. He played in 58 games with 36 starts for Houston from 2002 to 2005, with 121 total tackles, including 2.0 sacks among 13 tackles for loss, and 11 passes deflected.

Filmography

References

External links
NFL.com profile

1977 births
Living people
American football defensive ends
California Golden Bears football players
Washington Redskins players
Houston Texans players
Players of American football from Sacramento, California